Crouzeliinae is an extinct subfamily of Pliopithecidae primates that inhabited Europe and China during the Miocene, approximately 8–14.5 million years ago - they appear to have originated in Asia and extended their range into Europe between 17 and 13 million years ago. Crouzeliines can be distinguished from the other Pliopithecoidea subfamilies on the basis of uniquely derived dental traits.

Dental morphology 

As with nearly all Pliopithecoid taxa, Crouzliines are distinguished from the other Pliopithecoidea subfamilies, Dionysopithecinae and Pliopithecinae, on the basis of dental morphology.

Classification 

The Crouzeliinae subfamily is defined on the basis of the type genus, Crouzelia. Some authors have synonymized this genus with Plesiopliopithecus, whereas others retain the distinction. Regardless, the suprageneric taxon has remained, and has been further divided into two distinct tribes: Crouzeliini and Anapithecinii. Crouzeliini is made up of four morphologically similar species, all of which are placed into the same genus (Plesiopliopithecus auscitanensis, Plesiopliopithecus rhondanica, Plesiopliopithecus lockeri, and Plesiopliopithecus priensis). In contrast, Anapithecini contains four species, each of which is a unique genus (Anapithecus hernyaki, Laccopithecus robustus, Egarapithecus narcisoi, and Barberapithecus huerzeleri).

References 

Catarrhini
Prehistoric primates